The Joseph F. and Isabelle Jensen House, at 428 East 8800 South in Sandy, Utah, was built around 1902.  It was listed on the National Register of Historic Places in 1998, and it is also included in the National Register-listed Sandy Historic District

It is a one-story brick Victorian cottage with Queen Anne-style detailing.

Its bricks are laid in stretcher bond.

It is located on the northeast corner of the intersection of S. 420 E. with E. 8800 S.  There is a white picket fence outlining the property on its two street-facing sides.

References

National Register of Historic Places in Salt Lake County, Utah
Victorian architecture in Utah
Houses completed in 1902
1902 establishments in Utah
Houses in Salt Lake County, Utah
Buildings and structures in Sandy, Utah